Arie "Aar" de Goede (21 May 1928 – 16 May 2016) was a Dutch politician of the Democrats 66 (D66) party. He served in the House of Representatives (1967–1973), European Parliament (1979–1984) and Senate (1986–1987). As part of the executive he was State Secretary of Finance between 1973 and 1977.

Career
De Goede was born on 21 May 1928 in Vlaardingen. He attended the Middelbare Handelsschool (trade school) and subsequently followed a three-year course in tax law. In 1947 he started working for the Tax and Customs Administration in Schiedam. From 1951 he held jobs as an assistant to the managing board, assistant accountant and adjunct secretary at an economic/judicial advise agency.

De Goede became politically active for the Democrats 66 in 1967, when he became a member of the House of Representatives after the general election of February. He was one of the first seven members of Democrats 66 in the House. In the House he was part of a Kingdom of the Netherlands commission tasked with exploring the future relationships within the Kingdom. He served in the House until being appointed as State Secretary for Finance in the Den Uyl cabinet on 11 May 1973. De Goede stayed on until the end of the cabinet in December 1977.

Two years later De Goede was elected to the European Parliament. De Goede had been lijsttrekker for the Democrats 66 in the election. He served as member of the parliament between 17 July 1979 and 23 July 1984. De Goede returned to the national political level for a one-year stint in the Senate, where he served from 3 June 1986 to 23 June 1987.

De Goede was made a Knight in the Order of the Netherlands Lion on 11 April 1978. He died in Zoeterwoude on 16 May 2016.

Decorations

References

External links

Official
  A. (Aar) de Goede Parlement & Politiek
  A. de Goede (D66) Eerste Kamer der Staten-Generaal

1928 births
2016 deaths
Democrats 66 MEPs
Democrats 66 politicians
Knights of the Order of the Netherlands Lion
Members of the House of Representatives (Netherlands)
Members of the Senate (Netherlands)
MEPs for the Netherlands 1979–1984
People from Vlaardingen
People from Zoeterwoude
State Secretaries for Finance of the Netherlands
20th-century Dutch civil servants
20th-century Dutch politicians